Moore House is a historic home located at Poughkeepsie, Dutchess County, New York.  It was built about 1910 and is a -story, three-bay-wide bungalow-style dwelling with a sweeping, slate-covered roof with dormer.  It is stucco and features a broad front porch supported by massive stone piers.

It was added to the National Register of Historic Places in 1982.

References

Houses on the National Register of Historic Places in New York (state)
American Craftsman architecture in New York (state)
Houses completed in 1910
Houses in Poughkeepsie, New York
National Register of Historic Places in Poughkeepsie, New York